Meunier is a surname. Notable people with the surname include: 

 Christian Meunier (born 1967), French automotive businessman
 Claude Meunier (born 1951), Canadian actor and film director 
 Claude Marie Meunier (1770–1846), French general during the Napoleonic Wars
 Constantin Meunier, Belgian painter and sculptor
 David Meunier, American film and television actor
 Henri Meunier, Belgian art nouveau illustrator
 Manon Meunier (born 1996), French politician
 Michelle Meunier (born 1956), French politician
 Monique Meunier, former New York City Ballet principal dancer
 Pascal Meunier, documentary photographer about Arabian and Muslim world
 Sébastien Meunier, French fashion designer
 Sophie Meunier, the co-director of the Princeton University European Union program
 Thomas Meunier, Belgian footballer for Borussia Dortmund

See also

 Menier (disambiguation)
 Minier
 Mounier